Chugunov Island is a small ice-covered island, lying at the seaward extremity of the Shackleton Ice Shelf, between the projections of Denman Glacier and Scott Glacier. It was mapped from aerial photos taken by U.S. Navy Operation Highjump, 1946–47. It was rephotographed by the Soviet expedition of 1956 and later named for N.A. Chugunov, an aerologist who lost his life in the Antarctic in 1958.

See also 
 List of antarctic and sub-antarctic islands

References
 

Islands of Queen Mary Land